This is a list of AEW Dynamite episodes including episode number, location, venue and that night's main event. The show is broadcast in simulcast with TBS in the U.S (but is subject to scheduling) and is streamed on TSN Direct as well as TSN's website.

All dates, venues and main events are per the "results" page on the official AEW website.

2019

2020

2021

2022

2023

See also 
 List of AEW Rampage episodes
 List of AEW Dark episodes
 List of AEW Dark: Elevation episodes
 List of WWE Raw special episodes
 List of WWE SmackDown special episodes

References

Lists of American non-fiction television series episodes
All Elite Wrestling lists